Khodr Jihad Salame (born 4 December 1984) is a Lebanese professional footballer who plays as a midfielder for  club Sagesse.

Club career
Salame helped Safa reach the final of the 2008 AFC Cup, defeating Indian club Dempo in the semi-final.

In March 2021, Salame joined Sagesse in the Lebanese Second Division ahead of the second leg of the 2020–21 season.

Honours 
Safa
 Lebanese Premier League: 2011–12, 2012–13
 Lebanese FA Cup: 2012–13
 Lebanese Elite Cup: 2009, 2012
 AFC Cup runner-up: 2008

Individual
 Lebanese Premier League Team of the Season: 2011–12
 Lebanese Premier League top assist provider: 2011–12

References

External links
 
 
 
 

1984 births
Living people
People from Bint Jbeil District
Lebanese footballers
Association football midfielders
Safa SC players
Naft Maysan FC players
Al-Orobah FC players
Naft Al-Basra SC players
Racing Club Beirut players
Sagesse SC footballers
Lebanese Premier League players
Iraqi Premier League players
Saudi Professional League players
Lebanese Second Division players
Lebanon international footballers
Lebanese expatriate footballers
Lebanese expatriate sportspeople in Iraq
Lebanese expatriate sportspeople in Saudi Arabia
Expatriate footballers in Iraq
Expatriate footballers in Saudi Arabia